Galphimia is a genus in the Malpighiaceae, a family of about 75 genera of flowering plants in the order Malpighiales; the name is an anagram of Malpighia. Galphimia comprises 26 species of large herbs, shrubs, and treelets. Twenty-two species occur in Mexico, one (G. angustifolia) extending into Texas and one (G. speciosa) ranging to Nicaragua; four species (G. amambayensis, G. australis, G. brasiliensis, G. platyphylla) occur in South America, south of the Amazon Basin. Galphimia gracilis is widely cultivated in warm regions throughout the world (but often confused with G. glauca and also G. brasiliensis). Eight species (of Mexico and Central America) are distinctive in that the petals become stiff and papery, and persist past the stage of fruit maturation.

Galphimia is sometimes confused with Thryallis, a different genus of Malpighiaceae that occurs in Brazil and adjacent Paraguay and Bolivia. At one time some species now assigned to Galphimia were referred to Thryallis, but the generic name Thryallis is now a conserved name according to the rules of the International Code of Botanical Nomenclature. The genus Thryallis is distinctive in the stellate hairs and scales found on the vegetative parts, and in that the limb of the petals is much wider than long, traits not found in Galphimia.

Species

External links and references
Malpighiaceae - description, taxonomy, phylogeny, and nomenclature from the  University of Michigan Herbarium
Galphimia
Thryallis
Anderson, C. 2007. Revision of Galphimia (Malpighiaceae). Contributions from the University of Michigan Herbarium 25: 1–82.
Anderson, C. 1995. Revision of Thryallis (Malpighiaceae). Contributions from the University of Michigan Herbarium 20: 3–14.

Malpighiaceae
Malpighiaceae genera
Taxa named by Antonio José Cavanilles